The Bôi River is a river of Vietnam. It flows through Hòa Bình Province and Ninh Bình Province for 125 kilometres. The river has a basin area of 1550 km2.

References 

Rivers of Hòa Bình province
Rivers of Ninh Bình province
Rivers of Vietnam